The FIS Ski Flying World Ski Championships 1998 took place on 25 January 1998 in Oberstdorf, Germany for the record-tying fourth time, matching that of Planica, Slovenia. Oberstdorf hosted the championships previously in West Germany in 1973, 1981, and 1988. Japan's Kazuyoshi Funaki would go on to win the gold medal in the individual large hill event at the 1998 Winter Olympics in Nagano nearly three weeks later. As of 2009, he is the only person to win the Ski Flying World Championships and a Winter Olympic gold medal in the same year. Dieter Thoma became the first person to medal for two different nations at the championships with his bronze (He won the championships in 1990 while competing for West Germany.).

Individual
25 February 1998

Medal table

References
 FIS Ski flying World Championships 1998 results. - accessed 28 November 2009.

FIS Ski Flying World Championships
1998 in ski jumping
1998 in German sport
January 1998 sports events in Europe
Ski jumping competitions in Germany
1998 in Bavaria
Sports competitions in Bavaria